The 1967 Pacific Tigers football team represented the University of the Pacific during the 1967 NCAA University Division football season.

Pacific competed as an independent in 1967, and played home games in Pacific Memorial Stadium in Stockton, California. In their second season under head coach Doug Scovil, the Tigers finished with a record of four wins and five losses (4–5). For the 1967 season they outscored their opponents 201–158.

Schedule

NFL/AFL Draft
Two Tigers were selected in the 1968 NFL/AFL Draft.

Notes

References

Pacific
Pacific Tigers football seasons
1967 in sports in California